This is a list of animated short films produced by Terrytoons from 1929 to 1971, and later Filmation from 1968 to 1971. First produced by Paul Terry from 1929–1956, and then by CBS from 1953–1971, this list does also included cartoons originally produced for TV that were later screened in theaters 1959–1971.
This list does not include:
 Cartoons made for a television series, such as Lariat Sam or Tom Terrific
 Aesop's Film Fables
 Van Beuren Studios

1930s

1930 

 Caviar - February 23, 1930
 Pretzels - March 9, 1930
 Spanish Onions - March 23, 1930
 Indian Pudding - April 6, 1930
 Roman Punch - April 20, 1930
 Hot Turkey - May 4, 1930
 Hawaiian Pineapples - May 4, 1930
 Swiss Cheese - May 18, 1930
 Codfish Balls - June 1, 1930
 Hungarian Goulash - June 15, 1930
 Bully Beef - July 13, 1930
 Kangaroo Steak - July 27, 1930
 Monkey Meat - August 10, 1930
 Chop Suey - August 24, 1930
 French Fried (Farmer Al Falfa) - September 7, 1930
 Dutch Treat - September 21, 1930
 Irish Stew - October 5, 1930
 Fried Chicken - October 19, 1930
 Jumping Beans - November 2, 1930
 Scotch Highball - November 16, 1930
 Salt Water Taffy - November 30, 1930
 Golf Nuts - December 14, 1930
 Pigskin Capers - December 28, 1930

1931 

 Popcorn - January 11, 1931
 Club Sandwich (Farmer Al Falfa) - January 25, 1931
 Razzberries (Farmer Al Falfa) - February 8, 1931
 Go West, Big Boy - February 22, 1931
 Quack, Quack - March 8, 1931
 The Explorer (Farmer Al Falfa) - March 22, 1931
 Clowning - April 5, 1931
 Sing, Sing Prison - April 19, 1931
 The Fireman's Bride - May 3, 1931
 The Sultan's Cat (Farmer Al Falfa) - May 17, 1931
 A Day to Live - May 31, 1931
 2000 B.C. - June 14, 1931
 Blues - June 28, 1931
 By the Sea - July 12, 1931
 Her First Egg - July 26, 1931
 Jazz Mad (Farmer Al Falfa) - August 9, 1931
 Canadian Capers (Farmer Al Falfa) - August 23, 1931
 Jesse and James - September 6, 1931
 The Champ (Farmer Al Falfa) - September 20, 1931
 Around the World - October 4, 1931
 Jingle Bells - October 18, 1931
 The Black Spider - November 1, 1931
 China - November 15, 1931
 The Lorelei - November 29, 1931
 Summertime - December 13, 1931
 Aladdin's Lamp - December 27, 1931

1932 

 The Villain's Curse - January 10, 1932
 Noah's Outing (Farmer Al Falfa) - January 24, 1932
 The Spider Talks - February 7, 1932
 Peg Leg Pete - February 21, 1932
 Play Ball - March 6, 1932
 Ye Olde Songs (Farmer Al Falfa) - March 20, 1932
 Bull-ero - April 3, 1932
 Radio Girl - April 17, 1932
 Woodland (Farmer Al Falfa) - May 1, 1932
 Romance - May 15, 1932
 Bluebeard's Brother - May 29, 1932
 Farmer Al Falfa's Bedtime Story (Farmer Al Falfa) - June 12, 1932
 The Mad King - June 26, 1932
 Cocky Cock Roach - July 10, 1932
 Spring Is Here (Farmer Al Falfa) - July 24, 1932
 Farmer Al Falfa's Ape Girl (Farmer Al Falfa) - August 7, 1932
 Sherman Was Right - August 21, 1932
 Burlesque - September 4, 1932
 Southern Rhythm - September 10, 1932
 Farmer Al Falfa's Birthday Party (Farmer Al Falfa) - October 2, 1932
 College Spirit - October 16, 1932
 Hook and Ladder No. 1 - October 30, 1932
 The Forty Thieves - November 13, 1932
 Toyland (Farmer Al Falfa) - November 27, 1932
 Hollywood Diet - December 11, 1932
 Ireland Or Bust - December 25, 1932

1933 

 Jealous Lover - January 8, 1933
 Robin Hood - January 22, 1933
 Hansel and Gretel - February 5, 1933
 The Tale of a Shirt - February 19, 1933
 Down On the Levee - March 5, 1933
 Who Killed Cock - Robin - March 19, 1933
 Oh! Susanna - April 2, 1933
 Romeo and Juliet - April 16, 1933
 Pirate Ship - April 30, 1933
 Tropical Fish (Farmer Al Falfa) - May 14, 1933
 Cinderella - May 28, 1933
 King Zilch - June 11, 1933
 The Banker's Daughter (Fanny Zilch) - June 25, 1933
 The Oil Can Mystery (Fanny Zilch) - July 9, 1933
 Fanny In the Lion's Den (Fanny Zilch) - July 23, 1933
 Hypnotic Eyes (Fanny Zilch) - August 11, 1933
 Grand Uproar - August 25, 1933
 Pick-Necking (Farmer Al Falfa) - September 22, 1933
 Fanny's Wedding Day (Fanny Zilch) - October 6, 1933
 A Gypsy Fiddler - October 6, 1933
 Beanstalk Jack - October 20, 1933
 The Village Blacksmith (Farmer Al Falfa) - November 3, 1933
 Robinson Crusoe (Farmer Al Falfa) - November 17, 1933
 Little Boy Blue - November 30, 1933
 In Venice - December 15, 1933
 The Sunny South - December 29, 1933

1934 

 Holland Days (Farmer Al Falfa) - January 12, 1934
 The Three Bears - January 26, 1934
 Rip Van Winkle (Farmer Al Falfa) - February 9, 1934
 The Last Straw - February 23, 1934
 The Owl and the Pussycat (Farmer Al Falfa) - March 9, 1934
 A Mad House - March 23, 1934
 Joe's Lunch Wagon - April 6, 1934
 Just A Clown - April 20, 1934
 The King's Daughter - May 4, 1934
 The Lion's Friend - May 18, 1934
 Pandora - June 1, 1934
 Slow But Sure - June 15, 1934
 See the World - June 29, 1934
 My Lady's Garden - July 13, 1934
 Irish Sweepstakes - July 27, 1934
 Busted Blossoms - August 10, 1934
 Mice In Council - August 24, 1934
 Why Mules Leave Home (Farmer Al Falfa) - September 7, 1934
 Jail Birds - September 21, 1934
 The Black Sheep - October 5, 1934
 The Magic Fish - October 17, 1934
 Hot Sands - November 2, 1934
 Tom, Tom the Piper's Son - November 16, 1934
 Jack's Shack - November 30, 1934
 South Pole or Bust - December 14, 1934
 The Dog Show - December 28, 1934

1935 

 The First Snow - January 11, 1935
 What A Night (Farmer Al Falfa) - January 25, 1935
 The Bull Fight (Puddy the Pup) - February 6, 1935
 Fireman, Save My Child - February 22, 1935
 The Moth and the Spider - March 8, 1935
 Old Dog Tray (Farmer Al Falfa) - March 21, 1935
 Flying Oil (Farmer Al Falfa) - April 5, 1935
 Peg Leg Pete, The Pirate - April 19, 1935
 Modern Red Hood - May 3, 1935
 Five Puplets - May 17, 1935
 Opera Night - May 31, 1935
 King Looney XIV - June 14, 1935
 Moans and Groans (Farmer Al Falfa) - June 28, 1935
 Amateur Night - July 12, 1935
 The Foxy-Fox - July 26, 1935
 Chain Letters - August 9, 1935
 Birdland - August 23, 1935
 Circus Days - September 6, 1935
 Hey Diddle Diddle - September 20, 1935
 Foiled Again (Fanny Zilch) - October 14, 1935
 Football - October 15, 1935
 A June Bride (Farmer Al Falfa) - November 1, 1935
 Aladdin's Lamp - November 15, 1935
 Southern Horse - Pitality - November 29, 1935
 Ye Olde Toy Shop - December 13, 1935
 The Mayflower - December 27, 1935

1936 

 The Feud - January 10, 1936
 The 19th Hole Club (Farmer Al Falfa) - January 24, 1936
 Home Town Olympics (Farmer Al Falfa) - February 7, 1936
 The Alpine Yodeler (Farmer Al Falfa) - February 21, 1936
 Barnyard Amateurs (Farmer Al Falfa) - March 6, 1936
 Off to China - March 20, 1936
 The Western Trail (Farmer Al Falfa) - April 3, 1936
 A Wolf In Cheap Clothing - April 17, 1936
 Rolling Stones (Farmer Al Falfa) - May 1, 1936
 The Runt (Farmer Al Falfa) - May 15, 1936
 The Busy Bee - May 29, 1936
 The Sailor's Home - June 12, 1936
 A Tough Egg - June 26, 1936
 The Hot Spell (Farmer Al Falfa) - July 10, 1936
 Puddy Pup and the Gypsies (Puddy the Pup) - July 24, 1936
 Farmer Al Falfa's Prize Package (Farmer Al Falfa/Kiko the Kangaroo) - July 31, 1936
 Kiko and the Honey Bears (Kiko the Kangaroo) - August 21, 1936
 The Health Farm (Farmer Al Falfa) - September 4, 1936
 A Bully Frog - September 18, 1936
 Kiko Foils the Fox (Kiko the Kangaroo) - October 2, 1936
 Sunken Treasures (Puddy the Pup) - October 16, 1936
 A Battle Royal (Farmer Al Falfa) - October 30, 1936
 An Arrow Escape - November 13, 1936
 Farmer Al Falfa's 20th Anniversary (Farmer Al Falfa) - November 27, 1936
 Cats In the Bag (Puddy the Pup) - December 11, 1936
 Skunked Again (Farmer Al Falfa/Kiko the Kangaroo) - December 25, 1936

1937 

 Salty McGuire - January 8, 1937
 The Tin Can Tourist (Farmer Al Falfa) - January 22, 1937
 The Book Shop (Puddy the Pup) - February 5, 1937
 The Big Game Haunt (Farmer Al Falfa) - February 19, 1937
 Red Hot Music (Kiko the Kangaroo) - March 5, 1937
 Flying South (Farmer Al Falfa) - March 19, 1937
 The Hay Ride (Kiko the Kangaroo) - April 12, 1937
 Bug Carnival - April 16, 1937
 School Birds - April 30, 1937
 Puddy's Coronation (Puddy the Pup) - May 14, 1937
 Ozzie Ostritch Comes To Town (Kiko the Kangaroo) - May 28, 1937
 Play Ball (Kiko the Kangaroo) - June 11, 1937
 The Mechanical Cow (Farmer Al Falfa) - June 25, 1937
 Pink Elephants (Farmer Al Falfa) - July 9, 1937
 The Homeless Pup (Puddy the Pup) - July 23, 1937
 The Paper Hangers - July 30, 1937
 Trailer Life (Farmer Al Falfa) - August 20, 1937
 The Villain Still Pursued Her (Oil Can Harry) - September 3, 1937
 Kiko's Cleaning Day (Kiko the Kangaroo) - September 17, 1937
 A Close Shave (Farmer Al Falfa) - October 1, 1937
 The Dancing Bear (Farmer Al Falfa) - October 15, 1937
 The Saw Mill Mystery (Fanny Zilch) - October 29, 1937
 The Dog And the Bone (Puddy the Pup) - November 12, 1937
 The Timid Rabbit - November 26, 1937
 The Billy Goat's Whiskers (Farmer Al Falfa) - December 10, 1937
 The Barnyard Boss - December 24, 1937

1938 

 Lion Hunt - January 7, 1938
 Bugs Beetle and His Orchestra - January 21, 1938
 His Day Off (Puddy the Pup) - February 4, 1938
 Just Ask Jupiter - February 18, 1938
 Gandy the Goose (Gandy Goose) - March 4, 1938
 Happy and Lucky (Puddy the Pup) - March 18, 1938
 A Mountain Romance - April 1, 1938
 Robinson Crusoe's Broadcast - April 15, 1938
 Maid In China - April 29, 1938
 The Big Top (Puddy the Pup) - May 12, 1938
 Devil of the Deep - May 27, 1938
 Here's to the Good Old Jail - June 10, 1938
 The Last Indian - June 24, 1938
 Milk For Baby - July 8, 1938
 Mrs. O'Leary's Cow - July 22, 1938
 Eliza Runs Again - July 29, 1938
 Chris Columbo - August 12, 1938
 String Bean Jack - August 26, 1938
 The Goose Flies High (Gandy Goose) - September 9, 1938
 The Wolf's Side of the Story - September 23, 1938
 The Glass Slipper - October 7, 1938
 The Newcomer - October 21, 1938
 The Stranger Rides Again - November 4, 1938
 Housewife Herman - November 18, 1938
 The Village Blacksmith - December 2, 1938
 Doomsday (Gandy Goose) - December 16, 1938
 The Frame-Up (Gandy Goose) - December 30, 1938

1939 

 The Owl and the Pussycat (Sourpuss) - January 13, 1939
 One Gun Gary In Nick of Time - January 27, 1939
 The Three Bears - February 10, 1939
 Frozen Feet - February 24, 1939
 G-Man Jitters (Gandy Goose) - March 10, 1939
 The Nutty Network - March 24, 1939
 The Cuckoo Bird - April 7, 1939
 Their Last Bean - April 21, 1939
 Barnyard Egg - Citement - May 5, 1939
 Nick's Coffee Pot - May 19, 1939
 The Prize Guest - June 2, 1939
 A Bully Romance (Gandy Goose) - June 16, 1939
 Africa Squawks - June 30, 1939
 Barnyard Baseball (Gandy Goose) - July 14, 1939
 The Old Fire Horse - July 28, 1939
 Two-Headed Giant - August 11, 1939
 The Golden West - August 25, 1939
 Sheep In the Meadow - September 22, 1939
 Hook, Line and Sinker (Gandy Goose/Sourpuss) - September 28, 1939
 The Orphan Duck (Dinky Duck) - October 6, 1939
 The Watchdog - October 20, 1939
 One Mouse In A Million - November 3, 1939
 A Wicky, Wacky Romance - November 17, 1939
 The Hitch-Hiker (Gandy Goose) - December 1, 1939
 The Ice Pond - December 15, 1939
 The First Robin - December 29, 1939

1940s

1940 

 A Dog In A Mansion - January 12, 1940
 Edgar Runs Again - January 26, 1940
 Harvest Time - February 9, 1940
 The Hare and the Hounds - February 23, 1940
 All's Well That Ends Well - March 8, 1940
 Much Ado About Nothing (Dinky Duck) - March 22, 1940
 It Must Be Love (Gandy Goose) - April 5, 1940
 Just A Little Bull - April 19, 1940
 Wots All the Shootin' Fer - May 3, 1940
 Swiss Ski Yodelers - May 17, 1940
 Catnip Capers - May 31, 1940
 Professor Offkeyski - June 14, 1940
 Rover's Rescue - June 28, 1940
 Rupert the Runt - July 12, 1940
 Love In A Cottage - July 28, 1940
 Billy Mouse's Akwakade - August 9, 1940
 Club Life In the Stone Age - August 23, 1940
 The Lucky Ducky (Dinky Duck) - September 6, 1940
 Touchdown Demons - September 20, 1940
 How Wet Was My Ocean (Sourpuss) - October 4, 1940
 Happy Hunting Grounds - October 18, 1940
 Landing of the Pilgrims - November 1, 1940
 The Magic Pencil (Gandy Goose/Sourpuss) - November 15, 1940
 Plane Goofy (Farmer Al Falfa) - November 29, 1940
 The Snow Man - December 13, 1940
 The Temperamental Lion - December 27, 1940

1941 

 What A Little Sneeze Will Do - January 10, 1941
 Hairless Hector - January 24, 1941
 Mississippi Swing - February 7, 1941
 Fishing Made Easy (Sourpuss) - February 21, 1941
 The Home Guard (Gandy Goose) - March 7, 1941
 When Knights Were Bold - March 21, 1941
 The Baby Seal - April 10, 1941
 Uncle Joey - April 18, 1941
 A Dog's Dream - May 2, 1941
 The Magic Shell - May 16, 1941
 What Happens At Night - May 30, 1941
 Horsefly Opera - June 13, 1941
 Good Old Irish Tunes (Gandy Goose) - June 27, 1941
 Bringing Home the Bacon - July 11, 1941
 Twelve O'clock and All Ain't Well - July 25, 1941
 The Old Oaken Bucket - August 8, 1941
 The Ice Carnival - August 22, 1941
 The One-Man Navy (Gandy Goose) - September 5, 1941
 Uncle Joey Comes To Town - September 19, 1941
 Welcome Little Stranger (Dinky Duck) - October 3, 1941
 The Frozen North - October 17, 1941
 Slap Happy Hunters (Gandy Goose/Sourpuss) - October 31, 1941
 Back to the Soil - November 14, 1941
 The Bird Tower - November 28, 1941
 A Yarn About Yarn - December 12, 1941
 Flying Fever (Gandy Goose) - December 26, 1941

1942 

 A Torrid Toreador (Sourpuss) - January 9, 1942
 Happy Circus Days - January 23, 1942
 Funny Bunny Business - February 6, 1942
 Cat Meets Mouse - February 20, 1942
 Eat Me Kitty, Eight to the Bar - March 6, 1942
 Sham Battle Shenanigans (Gandy Goose/Sourpuss) - March 20, 1942
 Oh, Gentle Spring - April 3, 1942
 Lights Out (Gandy Goose/Sourpuss) - April 17, 1942
 Tricky Business (Gandy Goose/Sourpuss) - May 1, 1942
 Neck and Neck - May 15, 1942
 The Stork's Mistake - May 29, 1942
 All About Dogs - June 12, 1942
 Wilful Willie - June 26, 1942
 The Outpost (Gandy Goose/Sourpuss) - July 10, 1942
 Tire Trouble (Gandy Goose/Sourpuss) - July 24, 1942
 Doing Their Bit (Nancy) - August 3, 1942
 All Out For 'V''' - August 7, 1942
 Life With Fido (Dinky Duck) - August 21, 1942
 The Big Build-Up (Puddy the Pup) - September 4, 1942
 School Daze (Nancy) - September 18, 1942
 Night Life In the Army (Gandy Goose/Sourpuss) - October 12, 1942
 The Mouse of Tomorrow (Super Mouse) - October 16, 1942
 He Dood It Again (Super Mouse) - October 20, 1942
 Ickle Meets Pickle - November 6, 1942
 Frankenstein's Cat (Super Mouse) - November 27, 1942
 Barnyard WAAC - December 11, 1942
 Somewhere In the Pacific - December 25, 1942

 1943 

 Scrap For Victory (Gandy Goose/Sourpuss) - January 22, 1943
 Barnyard Blackout (Gandy Goose/Sourpuss) - March 5, 1943
 Shipyard Symphony - March 19, 1943
 Patriotic Pooches - April 9, 1943
 The Last Roundup (Gandy Goose/Sourpuss) - May 14, 1943
 Pandora's Box (Super Mouse) - June 11, 1943
 Mopping Up (Gandy Goose/Sourpuss) - June 25, 1943
 Keep 'em Growing - July 28, 1943
 Super Mouse Rides Again (Super Mouse) - June 8, 1943
 Camouflage - August 27, 1943
 Somewhere In Egypt (Gandy Goose/Sourpuss) - September 17, 1943
 Down With Cats (Super Mouse) - October 7, 1943
 Aladdin's Lamp (Gandy Goose/Sourpuss) - October 22, 1943
 Lion and the Mouse (Super Mouse/Heckle and Jeckle prototypes) - December 11, 1943
 Yokel Ducks Makes Good - November 26, 1943
 The Hopeful Donkey - December 17, 1943

 1944 

 The Wreck of the Hesperus (Mighty Mouse) - January 5, 1944
 The Butcher of Seville - January 7, 1944
 The Helicopter - January 21, 1944
 A Day In June - March 3, 1944
 The Champion of Justice (Mighty Mouse) - March 17, 1944
 The Frog and the Princess (Gandy Goose/Sourpuss) - April 7, 1944
 Mighty Mouse Meets Jekyll and Hyde Cat (Mighty Mouse) - April 28, 1944
 Wolf! Wolf! (Mighty Mouse) - May 11, 1944
 My Boy Johnny - May 12, 1944
 The Green Line (Mighty Mouse) - May 28, 1944
 Eliza On the Ice (Mighty Mouse) - June 16, 1944
 Carmen's Veranda (Gandy Goose) - July 28, 1944
 The Cat Came Back (Farmer Al Falfa) - August 18, 1944
 The Two Barbers (Mighty Mouse) - September 1, 1944
 The Ghost Town (Gandy Goose/Sourpuss) - September 22, 1944
 The Sultan's Birthday (Mighty Mouse) - October 13, 1944
 A Wolf's Tale - October 27, 1944
 At the Circus (Mighty Mouse) - November 17, 1944
 Gandy's Dream Girl (Gandy Goose/Sourpuss) - December 8, 1944
 Dear Old Switzerland - December 22, 1944

^formerly Super Mouse

 1945 

 Mighty Mouse and the Pirates (Mighty Mouse) - January 12, 1945
 The Port of Missing Mice (Mighty Mouse) - February 2, 1945
 Ants In Your Pantry - February 16, 1945
 Raiding the Raiders (Mighty Mouse) - March 9, 1945
 Post War Inventions (Gandy Goose/Sourpuss) - March 23, 1945
 Fisherman's Luck (Gandy Goose/Sourpuss) - March 23, 1945
 The Kilkenny Cats (Mighty Mouse) - April 13, 1945
 Mother Goose Nightmare (Gandy Goose/Sourpuss) - May 4, 1945
 Smoky Joe - May 25, 1945
 The Silver Streak (Mighty Mouse) - June 8, 1945
 Aesop's Fable.. The Mosquito (Gandy Goose/Sourpuss) - June 29, 1945
 Mighty Mouse and the Wolf (Mighty Mouse) - July 20, 1945
 Gypsy Life (Mighty Mouse) - August 3, 1945
 The Fox and the Duck - August 24, 1945
 Swooning the Swooners (Farmer Al Falfa) - September 11, 1945
 The Watchdog - September 28, 1945
 Who's Who In the Jungle (Gandy Goose/Sourpuss) - October 19, 1945
 Mighty Mouse Meets Bad Bill Bunion (Mighty Mouse) - November 9, 1945
 The Exterminator (Gandy Goose/Sourpuss) - November 23, 1945
 Krakatoa (Mighty Mouse) - December 4, 1945

 1946 

 The Talking Magpies (Farmer Al Falfa/Heckle & Jeckle prototypes) - January 4, 1946
 Svengali's Cat (Mighty Mouse) - January 18, 1946
 Fortune Hunters (Gandy Goose/Sourpuss) - February 8, 1946
 The Wicked Wolf (Mighty Mouse) - March 8, 1946
 My Old Kentucky Home (Mighty Mouse) - March 29, 1946
 It's All In the Stars (Gandy Goose/Sourpuss) - April 12, 1946
 Throwing the Bull (Mighty Mouse) - May 3, 1946
 The Golden Hen (Gandy Goose/Sourpuss) - May 24, 1946
 Dinky Finds A Home (Dinky Duck) - June 7, 1946
 The Johnstown Flood (Mighty Mouse) - June 28, 1946
 Peace Time Football (Gandy Goose) - July 19, 1946
 The Trojan Horse (Mighty Mouse) - July 26, 1946
 The Tortoise Wins Again - August 9, 1946
 Winning the West (Mighty Mouse) - August 16, 1946
 The Electronic Mouse Trap (Mighty Mouse) - September 6, 1946
 The Jail Break (Mighty Mouse) - September 20, 1946
 The Snow Man - October 11, 1946
 The Housing Problem - October 25, 1946
 The Crackpot King (Mighty Mouse) - November 15, 1946
 The Uninvited Pests (Farmer Al Falfa/Heckle & Jeckle) - November 29, 1946
 The Hep Cat (Mighty Mouse) - December 6, 1946
 Beanstalk Jack - December 20, 1946

 1947 

 Crying Wolf (Mighty Mouse) - January 10, 1947
 McDougal's Rest Farm (Heckle & Jeckle) - January 31, 1947
 The Dead End Cats (Mighty Mouse) - February 14, 1947
 Happy Go Lucky (Heckle & Jeckle) - February 28, 1947
 Mexican Baseball (Gandy Goose/Sourpuss) - March 14, 1947
 Aladdin's Lamp (Mighty Mouse) - March 28, 1947
 Cat Trouble (Heckle & Jeckle) - April 11, 1947
 The Sky Is Falling (Mighty Mouse) - April 25, 1947
 The Intruders (Heckle & Jeckle) - May 9, 1947
 Mighty Mouse Meets Deadeye Dick (Mighty Mouse) - May 30, 1947
 Flying South (Heckle & Jeckle) - August 15, 1947
 A Date For Dinner (Mighty Mouse) - August 29, 1947
 Fishing By the Sea (Heckle & Jeckle) - September 19, 1947
 The First Snow (Mighty Mouse) - October 10, 1947
 One Note Tony - October 22, 1947
 The Super Salesman (Heckle & Jeckle) - October 24, 1947
 A Fight to the Finish (Mighty Mouse) - November 14, 1947
 The Wolf's Pardon - December 5, 1947
 The Hitch Hikers (Heckle & Jeckle) - December 12, 1947
 Swiss Cheese Family Robinson (Mighty Mouse) - December 19, 1947
 Lazy Little Beaver (Mighty Mouse) - December 26, 1947

 1948 

 Felix the Fox - January 1, 1948
 Taming the Cat (Heckle & Jeckle) - January 1, 1948
 Mighty Mouse and the Magician (Mighty Mouse) - March 1, 1948
 The Chipper Chipmunk (Gandy Goose/Sourpuss) - March 9, 1948
 Hounding the Hares (Farmer Al Falfa) - April 1, 1948
 The Feudin' Hillbillies (Mighty Mouse) - April 1, 1948
 Mystery In the Moonlight - May 1, 1948
 Seeing Ghosts - June 1, 1948
 A Sleepless Night (Heckle & Jeckle) - June 24, 1948
 The Witch's Cat (Mighty Mouse) - July 15, 1948
 Magpie Madness (Heckle & Jeckle) - July 1, 1948
 Love's Labor Won (Mighty Mouse) - September 1, 1948
 The Hard Boiled Egg (Dingbat) - October 1, 1948
 The Mysterious Stranger (Mighty Mouse) - October 1, 1948
 Triple Trouble (Mighty Mouse) - November 1, 1948
 Free Enterprise (Heckle & Jeckle) - November 1, 1948
 Out Again In Again (Heckle & Jeckle) - November 1, 1948
 The Magic Slipper (Mighty Mouse) - December 1, 1948
 Gooney Golfers (Heckle & Jeckle) - December 1, 1948

 1949 

 The Wooden Indian - January 1, 1949
 The Power of Thought (Heckle & Jeckle) - January 1, 1949
 Racket Buster (Mighty Mouse) - February 1, 1949
 Dingbat Land (Gandy Goose/Sourpuss) - February 1, 1949
 The Lion Hunt (Heckle & Jeckle) - March 1, 1949
 The Stowaways (Heckle & Jeckle) - April 1, 1949
 A Cold Romance (Mighty Mouse) - April 1, 1949
 The Kitten Sitter - May 1, 1949
 Happy Landing (Heckle & Jeckle) - June 1, 1949
 The Catnip Gang (Mighty Mouse) - July 1, 1949
 Hula Hula Land (Heckle & Jeckle) - July 1, 1949
 The Lyin' Lion - August 1, 1949
 Mrs. Jones' Rest Farm - August 1, 1949
 The Covered Pushcart (Gandy Goose/Sourpuss) - September 1, 1949
 A Truckload of Trouble - October 1, 1949
 Perils of Pearl Pureheart (Mighty Mouse) - October 1, 1949
 Dancing Shoes (Heckle & Jeckle) - November 1, 1949
 Flying Cups and Saucers - November 1, 1949
 Paint Pot Symphony - December 1, 1949
 Stop, Look, and Listen (Mighty Mouse) - December 1, 1949

 1950s 
 1950 

 Comic Book Land (Gandy Goose/Sourpuss) - January 1, 1950
 The Fox Hunt (Heckle & Jeckle) - February 1, 1950
 Better Late Than Never - March 1, 1950
 Anti-Cats (Mighty Mouse) - March 1, 1950
 Foiling the Fox (Dingbat) - April 1, 1950
 The Beauty Shop (Dinky Duck) - April 1, 1950
 A Merry Chase (Heckle & Jeckle) - May 1, 1950
 Dream Walking (Gandy Goose/Sourpuss) - May 1, 1950
 Law and Order (Mighty Mouse) - June 1, 1950
 All This and Rabbit Stew (Dingbat) - June 1, 1950
 The Red-Headed Monkey - July 1, 1950
 The Dog Show - August 1, 1950
 King Tut's Tomb (Heckle & Jeckle) - August 1, 1950
 Cat Happy (Roquefort & Percy) - September 1, 1950
 If Cats Could Sing - October 1, 1950
 Mouse and Garden (Roquefort & Percy) - October 1, 1950
 Beauty On the Beach (Mighty Mouse) - November 1, 1950
 Wide Open Spaces (Gandy Goose) - November 1, 1950
 Sour Grapes (Dingbat) - December 1, 1950
 Mother Goose's Birthday Party (Mighty Mouse) - December 1, 1950
 Woodman, Spare That Tree - December 1, 1950

 1951 

 Rival Romeos (Heckle & Jeckle) - January 1, 1951
 Squirrel Crazy - January 1, 1951
 Three Is A Crowd (Roquefort & Percy) - February 1, 1951
 Stage Struck (Half Pint) - February 1, 1951
 Sunny Italy (Mighty Mouse) - March 1, 1951
 Songs of Erin (Gandy Goose) - March 1, 1951
 Spring Fever (Gandy Goose) - March 1, 1951
 Bulldozing the Bull (Heckle & Jeckle) - March 1, 1951
 Goons From the Moon (Mighty Mouse) - March 11, 1951
 Musical Madness (Roquefort & Percy) - May 1, 1951
 The Elephant Mouse (Half Pint) - May 1, 1951
 The Rainmakers (Heckle & Jeckle) - June 1, 1951
 Injun Trouble (Mighty Mouse) - June 1, 1951
 Seasick Sailors (Roquefort & Percy) - July 1, 1951
 Tall Timber Tale (Terry Bears) - July 1, 1951
 Golden Egg Goosie - August 1, 1951
 A Swiss Miss (Mighty Mouse) - August 1, 1951
 Steeple Jacks (Heckle & Jeckle) - September 1, 1951
 Little Problems (Terry Bears) - September 1, 1951
 Pastry Panic (Roquefort & Percy) - October 1, 1951
 The Helpful Genie (Roquefort & Percy) - October 1, 1951
 Sno Fun (Heckle & Jeckle) - November 1, 1951
 A Cat's Tale (Mighty Mouse) - November 1, 1951
 Beaver Trouble - December 1, 1951
 The Haunted Cat (Roquefort & Percy) - December 1, 1951

 1952 

 Papa's Little Helpers (Terry Bears) - January 1, 1952
 Movie Madness (Heckle & Jeckle) - January 1, 1952Flat Foot Fledgling (Dinky Duck) - January 25, 1952
 Mechanical Bird - February 1, 1952
 Seaside Adventures - February 1, 1952
 City Slicker (Roquefort & Percy) - March 1, 1952
 Prehistoric Perils (Mighty Mouse) - March 1, 1952
 Papa's Day of Rest (Terry Bears) - March 1, 1952
 Flatfoot Fledgling (Dinky Duck) - April 1, 1952
 Time Gallops On - April 1, 1952
 Off to the Opera (Heckle & Jeckle) - May 1, 1952
 The Foolish Duckling (Dinky Duck) - May 1, 1952
 The Happy Cobblers - May 1, 1952
 Hypnotized (Roquefort & Percy) - June 1, 1952
 Hansel and Gretel (Mighty Mouse) - June 1, 1952
 Flipper Frolics - July 1, 1952
 Little Anglers (Terry Bears) - July 1, 1952
 House Busters (Heckle & Jeckle) - August 1, 1952
 Sink Or Swim (Dinky Duck) - August 28, 1952
 The Mysterious Cowboy - September 1, 1952
 Happy Valley - September 1, 1952
 Good Mousekeeping (Roquefort & Percy) - October 1, 1952
 Nice Doggy (Terry Bears) - October 1, 1952
 Happy Holland (Mighty Mouse) - November 1, 1952
 Moose On the Loose (Heckle & Jeckle) - November 1, 1952
 Flop Secret (Roquefort & Percy) - December 1, 1952
 Picnic With Papa (Terry Bears) - December 1, 1952

 1953 

 A Soapy Opera (Mighty Mouse) - January 1, 1953
 Thrifty Cubs (Terry Bears) - January 1, 1953
 Pill Peddlers (Heckle & Jeckle) - January 6, 1953
 Hair Cut-Ups (Heckle & Jeckle) - February 1, 1953
 Wise Quacks (Dinky Duck) - February 1, 1953
 Mouse Meets Bird (Roquefort & Percy) - March 1, 1953
 Snappy Snap Shots (Terry Bears) - March 1, 1953
 Ten Pin Terrors (Heckle & Jeckle) - March 30, 1953
 The Orphan Egg (Dinky Duck) - April 1, 1953
 Hero For A Day (Mighty Mouse) - April 1, 1953
 Featherweight Champ (Dinky Duck) - May 1, 1953
 Playful Puss (Roquefort & Percy) - May 1, 1953
 Plumber's Helpers (Terry Bears) - May 1, 1953
 Hot Rods (Mighty Mouse) - June 1, 1953
 Sparky the Firefly - June 26, 1953
 Friday the 13th (Roquefort & Percy) - July 1, 1953
 When Mousehood Was In Flower (Mighty Mouse) - July 1, 1953
 Open House (Terry Bears) - August 1, 1953
 Bargain Daze (Heckle & Jeckle) - August 1, 1953
 Mouse Menace (Roquefort & Percy) - September 1, 1953
 The Reluctant Pup (Terry Bears) - October 1, 1953
 How to Keep Cool (Dimwit) - October 1, 1953
 The Timid Scarecrow (Dinky Duck) - November 1, 1953
 Log Rollers (Heckle & Jeckle) - November 1, 1953
 Growing Pains (Terry Bears) - December 1, 1953

 1954 

 Spare the Rod (Mighty Mouse) - January 1, 1954
 Runaway Mouse (Roquefort & Percy) - January 1, 1954
 How to Relax (Dimwit) - February 1, 1954
 Blind Date (Heckle & Jeckle) - February 1, 1954
 Nonsense Newsreel - March 1, 1954
 The Helpless Hippo (Mighty Mouse) - March 1, 1954
 Pet Problems (Terry Bears) - April 1, 1954
 Prescription For Percy (Roquefort & Percy) - April 1, 1954
 Satisfied Customers (Heckle & Jeckle) - May 1, 1954
 The Tall Tale Teller (Phoney Baloney) - May 1, 1954
 Arctic Rivals (Willie the Walrus) - June 1, 1954
 A Howling Success (Terry Bears) - July 1, 1954
 Pride of the Yard (Percival Sleuthhound) - August 1, 1954
 The Cat's Revenge (Roquefort & Percy) - September 1, 1954
 The Reformed Wolf (Mighty Mouse) - October 1, 1954
 Blue Plate Symphony (Heckle & Jeckle) - October 1, 1954

 1955 

 Barnyard Actor (Gandy Goose) - January 1, 1955
 A Yokohama Yankee - January 1, 1955
 Duck Fever (Terry Bears) - February 1, 1955
 The First Flying Fish - February 1, 1955
 No Sleep For Percy (Roquefort & Percy) - March 1, 1955
 An Igloo For Two (Willie the Walrus) - March 1, 1955
 Good Deed Daly (Good Deed Daly) - April 1, 1955
 Bird Symphony - April 1, 1955
 Phony News Flashes - May 1, 1955
 Foxed By A Fox - May 1, 1955
 The Last Mouse of Hamelin - June 1, 1955
 Little Red Hen - July 1, 1955

 1956 

 The Clockmaker's Dog - January 1, 1956
 Park Avenue Pussycat - January 1, 1956
 Miami Maniacs (Heckle & Jeckle) - February 1, 1956
 Uranium Blues (Farmer Al Falfa) - March 1, 1956
 Hep Mother Hubbard - March 1, 1956
 Scouts to the Rescue (Good Deed Daly) - April 1, 1956
 Baffling Bunnies (Terry Bears) - April 1, 1956
 Oceans of Love - May 1, 1956
 Lucky Dog - June 1, 1956
 Police Dogged (Clancy the Bull) - July 1, 1956
 The Brave Little Brave - July 1, 1956
 Cloak and Stagger (Good Deed Daly) - August 1, 1956

 1957 

 Pirate's Gold (Heckle & Jeckle) - January 1, 1957
 Topsy TV (John Doormat) - January 1, 1957
 Gag Buster - February 1, 1957
 A Hare-Breadth Finish - February 1, 1957
 African Jungle Hunt (Phoney Baloney) - March 1, 1957
 A Bum Steer - March 1, 1957
 The Bone Ranger - April 1, 1957
 Daddy's Little Darling (Dimwit) - April 1, 1957
 Love Is Blind - May 1, 1957
 Gaston Is Here (Gaston Le Crayon) - May 1, 1957
 Shove Thy Neighbor (John Doormat) - June 1, 1957
 Clint Clobber's Cat (Clint Clobber) - July 1, 1957
 Flebus - August 1, 1957

 1958 

 Springtime For Clobber (Clint Clobber) - January 1, 1958
 It's A Living (Dinky Duck) - February 1, 1958
 Gaston's Baby (Gaston Le Crayon) - March 1, 1958
 The Juggler of Our Lady - April 1, 1958
 Gaston Go Home (Gaston Le Crayon) - May 1, 1958
 Dustcap Doormat (John Doormat) - June 1, 1958
 Camp Clobber (Clint Clobber) - July 1, 1958
 Sick, Sick Sidney (Sidney) - August 1, 1958
 Old Mother Clobber (Clint Clobber) - September 1, 1958
 Gaston's Easel Life (Gaston Le Crayon) - October 1, 1958
 Signed, Sealed, and Clobbered (Clint Clobber) - November 1, 1958
 Sidney's Family Tree (Sidney) - December 1, 1958

 1959 

 Clobber's Ballet Ache (Clint Clobber) - January 1, 1959
 The Tale of A Dog - February 1, 1959
 Another Day, Another Doormat (John Doormat) - March 1, 1959
 The Flamboyant Arms (Clint Clobber) - April 1, 1959
 Foofle's Train Ride (Foofle) - May 1, 1959
 Gaston's Mama Lisa (Gaston Le Crayon) - June 1, 1959
 The Minute and A ½ Man (Hector Heathcote) - July 18, 1959
 The Fabulous Firework Family - August 1, 1959
 Wild Life (Heckle & Jeckle) - September 1, 1959
 Hashimoto-San (Hashimoto) - October 1, 1959
 Outer Space Visitor (Mighty Mouse) - November 1, 1959
 The Leaky Faucet (Dimwit) - December 1, 1959

 1960s 
 1960 

 Thousand Smile Check-Up (Heckle & Jeckle) - January 1, 1960
 Hide and Go Sidney (Sidney) - January 1, 1960
 The Space Varmint (Deputy Dawg) - January 1, 1960 (Some sources state that it was released 1962)
 The Misunderstood Giant - February 1, 1960
 Foofle's Picnic (Foofle) - March 1, 1960
 The Tiger King - March 1, 1960
 The Famous Ride (Hector Heathcote) - April 1, 1960
 Tusk, Tusk (Sidney) - May 1, 1960
 Mint Men (Heckle & Jeckle) - May 1, 1960
 Hearts and Glowers - June 1, 1960
 The Wayward Hat (Foofle) - July 1, 1960
 Trapeze, Pleeze (Heckle & Jeckle) - July 1, 1960
 The Littlest Bully (Sidney) - August 1, 1960
 Two Ton Baby Sitter (Sidney) - September 1, 1960
 Tin Pan Alley Cat - October 1, 1960
 Deep Sea Doodle (Heckle & Jeckle) - October 1, 1960
 House of Hashimoto (Hashimoto) - November 1, 1960
 Stunt Men (Heckle & Jeckle) - December 1, 1960
 Daniel Boone, Jr. (Hector Heathcote) - December 1, 1960

 1961 

 The Mysterious Package (Mighty Mouse) -  January 1, 1961
 Night Life In Tokyo (Hashimoto) - February 2, 1961
 Cat Alarm (Mighty Mouse) -  February 7, 1961
 So Sorry Pussycat (Hashimoto) - March 6, 1961
 Strange Companion (Hashimoto) - April 1, 1961
 Son of Hashimoto (Hashimoto) - April 3, 1961
 Drum Roll (Hector Heathcote) - April 4, 1961
 The First Fast Mail (Hector Heathcote) - May 3, 1961
 Railroaded to Fame (Hector Heathcote) - May 6, 1961
 Unsung Hero (Hector Heathcote) - May 30, 1961
 Honorable Cat Story (Hashimoto) - June 1, 1961
 Crossing the Delaware (Hector Heathcote) - June 3, 1961
 Banana Binge (Sidney) - June 1, 1961
 Meat, Drink and Be Merry (Sidney) - August 1, 1961
 Really Big Act (Sidney) - September 1, 1961
 Clown Jewels (Sidney) - October 1, 1961
 Tree Spree (Sidney) - November 1, 1961
 Sappy New Year (Heckle & Jeckle) - December 1, 1961
 Honorable House Cat (Hashimoto) - December 1, 1961

 1962 

 Klondike Strikes Out (Hector Heathcote) - January 1, 1962
 Where there's Smoke (Deputy Dawg) - February 1, 1962
 The Covered Push Cart (Gandy Goose, Sourpuss)- 1962
 He-Man Seaman (Hector Heathcote) - March 1, 1962
 Honorable Family Problem (Hashimoto) - March 1, 1962
 Loyal Royalty (Hashimoto) - April 1, 1962
 Nobody's Ghost (Deputy Dawg) - April 1, 1962
 Peanut Battle (Sidney) - April 1, 1962
 Riverboat Mission (Hector Heathcote) - May 1, 1962
 Rebel Trouble (Deputy Dawg) - May 1, 1962
 Send Your Elephant to Camp (Sidney) - July 1, 1962
 Big Chief No Treaty (Deputy Dawg) - August 1, 1962
 Shotgun Shambles (Deputy Dawg) - August 1, 1962
 Honorable Paint In the Neck (Hashimoto) - September 1, 1962
 The Fleet's Out (Sidney) - October 1, 1962
 First Flight Up (Hector Heathcote) - October 1, 1962
 Home Life (Sidney) - November 1, 1962
 A Flight to the Finish (Hector Heathcote) - December 1, 1962

 1963 

 Tea House Mouse (Hashimoto) - January 1, 1963
 To Be Or Not to Be (Sidney) - February 1, 1963
 Astronut (Deputy Dawg) - March 1, 1963
 The Missing Genie (Luno the White Stallion) - April 1, 1963
 The Hungry Astronut (Deputy Dawg) - April 27, 1963
 Tea Party (Hector Heathcote) - May 1, 1963
 Pearl Crazy (Hashimoto) - June 1, 1963
 Sidney's White Elephant (Sidney) - June 1, 1963
 Cherry Blossom Festival (Hashimoto) - July 1, 1963
 A Bell For Philadelphia (Hector Heathcote) - July 1, 1963
 Trouble In Baghdad (Luno) - August 1, 1963
 Driven to Extraction (Sidney) - August 1, 1963
 The Big Clean-Up (Hector Heathcote) - September 1, 1963
 Search for a Symbol (Hector Heathcote) - September 1, 1963
 Hats Off to Hector! (Hector Heathcote) - September 1, 1963
 The First Telephone (Hector Heathcote) - September 1, 1963
 Messy Messenger (Hector Heathcote) - September 1, 1963
 Foxed by a Fox (Hector Heathcote) - September 1, 1963
 High Flyer (Hector Heathcote) - September 1, 1963
 Hold the Fort! (Hector Heathcote) - September 1, 1963
 Valley Forge Hero (Hector Heathcote) - October 1, 1963
 Expert Explorer (Hector Heathcote) - October 1, 1963
 Spooky-Yaki (Hashimoto) - October 1, 1963
 Split-Level Treehouse (Sidney) - November 1, 1963

 1964 

 Roc-A-Bye Sinbad (Luno) - January 1, 1964
 The Red Tractor (Duckwood) - February 1, 1964
 Brother From Outer Space (Astronut) -  March 1, 1964
 King Rounder (Luno) - April 1, 1964
 Short-Term Sheriff (Duckwood) - May 1, 1964
 Kisser Plant (Astronut) -  June 1, 1964
 Adventure By the Sea (Luno) - July 1, 1964
 Oil Thru the Day (Duckwood) - August 1, 1964
 Outer Galaxy Gazette (Astronut) -  September 1, 1964
 The Gold Dust Bandit (Luno) - October 1, 1964
 Search For Misery - November 1, 1964
 Molecular Mixup (Astronut) - December 1, 1964

 1965 

 Gadmouse the Apprentice Good Fairy (Sad Cat) - January 1, 1965
 The Sky's the Limit (Astronut) -  February 1, 1965
 Freight Fright (Possible Possum) - March 1, 1965
 Don't Spill the Beans (Sad Cat) - April 1, 1965
 Weather Magic (Astronut) - May 1, 1965
 Darn Barn (Possible Possum) - June 1, 1965
 Dress Reversal (Sad Cat) - July 1, 1965
 Robots In Toyland (Astronut) - August 1, 1965
 Git That Guitar (Possible Possum) - September 1, 1965
 The Third Musketeer (Sad Cat) - October 1, 1965
 Twinkle Twinkle Little Telestar (Astronut) - November 1, 1965
 The Toothless Beaver (Possible Possum) - December 1, 1965

 1966 

 Gems From Gemini (Astronut) - January 1, 1966
 Dr. Ha-Ha (James Hound) - February 1, 1966
 Messed Up Movie Makers (Heckle & Jeckle) - March 1, 1966
 Champion Chump (Martian Moochers) - April 1, 1966
 Haunted House Cleaning (Astronut) - May 1, 1966
 Scuba Duba Do (Sad Cat) - June 1, 1966
 The Monster Master (James Hound) - July 1, 1966
 Cowardly Watchdog (Martian Moochers) - August 1, 1966
 The Rain Drain (James Hound) - September 1, 1966
 Watch the Butterfly (Possible Possum) - October 1, 1966
 Dreamnapping (James Hound) - November 1, 1966
 The Phantom Skyscraper (James Hound) - December 1, 1966

 1967 

 A Voodoo Spell (James Hound) - January 1, 1967
 Mr. Winlucky (James Hound) - February 1, 1967
 It's For the Birds (James Hound) - March 1, 1967
 The Heat's Off (James Hound) - April 1, 1967
 Traffic Trouble (James Hound) - May 1, 1967
 Bugged By a Bug (James Hound) - June 1, 1967
 Fancy Plants (James Hound) - July 1, 1967
 Give Me Liberty (James Hound) - August 1, 1967
 Which Is Witch (James Hound) - September 1, 1967
 Dr. Rhinestone's Theory (James Hound) - October 1, 1967
 Frozen Sparklers (James Hound) - November 1, 1967
 Baron Von Go-Go (James Hound) - December 1, 1967

 1968 

 Dribble Drabble (Sad Cat) - January 1, 1968
 Big Game Fishing (Sad Cat) - February 1, 1968
 Grand Prix Winner (Sad Cat) - March 1, 1968
 Big Bad Bobcat (Possible Possum) - April 1, 1968
 Commander Great Guy (Sad Cat) - May 1, 1968
 All Teed Off (Sad Cat) - June 1, 1968
 Surprisin' Exercisin (Possible Possum) - July 1, 1968
 Judo Kudos (Sad Cat) - August 1, 1968
 The Abominable Mountaineers (Sad Cat) - September 1, 1968
 The Rock Hound (Possible Possum) - October 1, 1968
 Loops and Swoops (Sad Cat) - November 1, 1968
 Mount Piney (Possible Possum) - December 1, 1968

 1969 

 The General's Little Helper (Possible Possum) - February 1, 1969
 Space Pet (Astronut) - March 1, 1969
 The Stretcher (Mighty Heroes) - April 1, 1969
 The Red Swamp Pox (Possible Possum) - May 1, 1969
 The Bold Eagle (Possible Possum) - May 1, 1969
 Scientific Sideshow (Astronut) - June 1, 1969
 Balloon Snatcher (Astronut) - September 1, 1969
 The Frog (Mighty Heroes) - October 1, 1969 (originally produced for television in 1966)
 Swamp Snapper (Possible Possum) - November 1, 1969
 The Toy Man (Mighty Heroes) - December 1, 1969 (originally produced for television in 1966)

 1970s 
 1970 

 Lost and Foundation (Hector Heathcote) - June 1, 1970
 Land Grab (Hector Heathcote) - February 1, 1970
 Going Ape (Astronut) - January 1, 1970
 Belabour Thy Neighbor (Hector Heathcote) - October 1, 1970
 Surface Surf Aces (Possible Possum) - March 1, 1970
 The Ghost Monster (Mighty Heroes) - April 1, 1970 (originally produced for television in 1967)
 Martian Moochers (Astronut/Martian Moochers) - March 1, 1970
 Swamp Water Taffy (Possible Possum) - July 1, 1970
 The Proton Pulsator (Astronut) - September 1, 1970
 Slinky Minky (Possible Possum) - November 1, 1970
 The Shocker (Mighty Heroes) - December 1, 1970 (originally produced for television in 1966)

 1971 

 Train Terrain (Hector Heathcote) - February 1, 1971
 Oscar's Birthday Present (Astronut) - January 1, 1971
 Berry Funny (Possible Possum) - March 1, 1971
 The Enlarger (Mighty Heroes) - April 1, 1971 (originally produced for television in 1966)
 Oscar's Thinking Cap (Astronut) - May 1, 1971
 Big Mo (Possible Possum) - July 1, 1971
 The Duster (Mighty Heroes) - August 1, 1971 (originally produced for television in 1967)
 No Space Like Home (Astronut) - October 1, 1971
 Ice Cream For Help (Hector Heathcote) - October 1, 1971
 Kooky Cucumbers (Possible Possum) - November 1, 1971
 The Big Freeze'' (Mighty Heroes) - December 1, 1971 (originally produced for television in 1967)

American animated short films
American children's animated comedy films
Lists of American animated films